Stephen Booth (born 1952) is an English crime-writer. He is the author of the Derbyshire-set Cooper and Fry series.

Early and personal life
Booth was born in Burnley, Lancashire, the son of Jim and Edna Booth. At the age of two, he moved with his parents to Blackpool where he attended Arnold School. He lives with his wife Lesley in Retford, Nottinghamshire.

Career
For over 27 years, he was a journalist for various newspapers and magazines including the Wilmslow Advertiser, Huddersfield Examiner, and the Worksop Guardian. He also worked as a sub-editor for the Daily Express and The Guardian. In 2001 he gave this up to be a full-time novelist.

Bibliography

Cooper and Fry series, about two young Derbyshire police detectives, Ben Cooper and Diane Fry, as they try to solve various murders:
Black Dog (2000)
Dancing with the Virgins (2001) 
Blood on the Tongue (2002)
Blind to the Bones (2003)
One Last Breath (2004)
The Dead Place (2005)
Scared to Live (2006)
Dying to Sin (2007)
The Kill Call (2009)
Lost River (2010)
The Devil's Edge (2011)
Dead and Buried (2012)
Already Dead (2013)
The Corpse Bridge (2014)
 The Murder Road (2015)
Secrets of Death (2016)
Dead in the Dark (2017)
Fall Down Dead (2018)

Ben Cooper novella:
 Claws (2007)

Stand-alone novels:
 Top Hard (2011)
Drowned Lives (2019)

Awards and nominations

2001 – Barry Award for Best British Crime Novel: Black Dog
2001 – Crime Writers' Association Gold Dagger for Best Crime Novel of the Year (shortlist): Dancing with the Virgins
2002 – Barry Award for Best British Crime Novel: Dancing With the Virgins
2003 – Dagger in the Library
2006 – Theakston's Old Peculier Crime Novel of the Year Award (shortlist): One Last Breath
2007 – Theakston's Old Peculier Crime Novel of the Year Award (shortlist): The Dead Place

References

External links
Official Website

1952 births
English crime fiction writers
English male journalists
People educated at Arnold School
People from Burnley
People from Blackpool
Living people
Barry Award winners
English male novelists